Nor Burastan Cemetery (also known as the Christian Armenian Burastan Cemetery) is the major Armenian cemetery located in southeast of Tehran. It was established in 1974 and has a chapel by the name of St. Stephen (hy).

Notable burials
 Varoujan Hakhbandian (Վարուժան Հախբանդյան) (1936–1977) – musician
 Arman Hovsepian (Արամայիս Հովսեփյան) (1921–1980) – actor
 Zorik Moradian (Զորիկ Մուրադեան) (fa) (1960–1980) – war martyr
 Vartan Hovanessian (Վարդան Յովհանիսեան) (1896–1982) – architect
 Vigen Karapetian (Վիգեն Կարապետյան) (fa) (1965–1987) – war martyr
 Hrair Khalatian (Հրայր Խալաթյան) (fa) (1929–1988) – politician
 Salma Gouyoumjian (Սալմա Գույումճյան) (fa) (1907–1990) – archaeologist
 Elbis Ferahian (Էլբիս Ֆերահեան) (fa) (1907–1994) – educator
 Haik Hovsepian Mehr (Հայկ Հովսեփյան Մեհր) (1945–1994) – bishop of the Jama'at-e Rabbani church
 Clara Abgar (Կլարա Աբգար) (hy) (1922–1996) – painter
 Samuel Khachikian (Սամուէլ Խաչիկեան) (1923–2001) – film director
 Emanuel Melik-Aslanian (Էմանուէլ Մելիք- Ասլանեան) (de) (1915–2003) – musician
 Lorik Minassian (Լորիկ Մինասեան) (fa) (1944–2004) – actress
 Caro Lucas (Կարո Լուկաս Ղուկասեան) (1949–2010) – scholar
 Valodya Tarkhanian (Վալոդյա Թարխանյան) (fa) (1925–2012) – musician
 Irene Zazians (Իրեն Զազյանց) (1927–2012) – actress
 Levon Davidian (Լեւոն Դաւթեան) (1944–2009) – politician
 Alenush Terian (Ալենուշ Տերյան) (1921–2011) – astronomer and physicist
 Janet Lazarian (Ժանետ Լազարյան) (fa) (1940–2014) – author
 Bergrouni Poghosian (Բերգունի Պօղոսեան) (fa) (1948–2014) – film maker
 Robert Avetisian (Ռոբերտ Ավետիսյան) (fa) (1966–2014) – war veteran
 Andranik Hovian (Անդրանիկ Հովուեան) (fa) (1933–2015) – scholar
 Nshan Tanik (Նշան Թանիկ) (fa) (1949–2015) – sculptor
 Garnik Yadegarian (Գարնիկ Եադեգարեան) (fa) (1960–2015) – film maker
 Levon Haftvan (Լեւոն Հաֆթվան) (fa) (1966–2018) – actor
 Lilit Teryan (Լիլիթ Տէրեան) (1930–2019) – sculptor
 Razmik Minassian (Ռազմիկ Մինասեան) (1942- 1985) Iranian Air Force Architect

References

External links
 

Cemeteries in Tehran
Cemeteries in Iran
Armenian cemeteries